Tom Green (born 1971) is a Canadian actor, comedian, talk show host and media personality.

Tom Green or Tommy Green may also refer to:

Sports

Association football (soccer)
 Tommy Green (footballer, born 1863) (1863–1923), English footballer for Aston Villa
 Tommy Green (footballer, born 1873) (1873–1921), English footballer for West Bromwich Albion
 Tommy Green (footballer, born 1876) (1876–1958), English footballer for New Brighton Tower, Liverpool, Middlesbrough and Stockport County
 Tommy Green (footballer, born 1893) (1893–1975), English footballer for West Ham United, Accrington Stanley, Stockport County and Clapton Orient
 Tommy Green (footballer, born 1913) (1913–1997), English footballer for West Bromwich Albion

Other sports
 Tommy Green (athlete) (1894–1975), British race walker
 Tom Green (basketball) (born 1949), American college basketball coach
 Tom Green (field hockey) (born 1974), Canadian field hockey player
 Tom Green (footballer, born 1909) (1909–1979), Australian rules footballer for Hawthorn
 Tom Green (footballer, born 2001), Australian rules footballer for Greater Western Sydney
 Tom Green (golfer) (1900–1974), Welsh golfer
 Tom Green (runner) (born 1950/1), American marathon runner

Others
 Tom Green (artist) (1913–1980), Australian artist
 Tom Green (attorney) (born 1941/2), American defense lawyer
 Tom Green (designer) (fl. 1964), designer and driver of the land speed record holder Wingfoot Express
 Tom Green (polygamist) (born 1948), American Mormon fundamentalist in Utah who practiced plural marriage
 Tom Patrick Green (1942–2012), American painter and art professor

Other uses
 Tom Green County, Texas, American geographic designation

See also
 Thom Green (born 1991), Australian dancer and actor 
 Thom Sonny Green, English drummer and electronic music producer
 Thomas Green (disambiguation)
 Thomas Greene (disambiguation)
 Tommie Green (1956–2015), American basketball player

Green, Tom